IL6, Il-6, or IL-6 may refer to:
 Illinois's 6th congressional district
 Illinois Route 6
 Ilyushin Il-6, a Soviet long-range bomber
 Interleukin 6, a pro-inflammatory cytokine